Kobe held a mayoral election on October 23, 2005. Incumbent Tatsuo Yada backed by all parties except JCP won.

 
 
 
 
 
 

Events in Kobe
2005 elections in Japan
Mayoral elections in Japan
October 2005 events in Japan